Pancratium maritimum, or sea daffodil, is a species of bulbous plant native to the Canary Islands and both sides of the Mediterranean region and Black Sea from Portugal, Morocco and the Balearic Islands east to Turkey, Syria, Israel and the Caucasus. In the parts of its range on the south Bulgarian and north Turkish and Georgian coasts of Black Sea. It is also naturalized in southern California, Bermuda and the Azores.

Pancratium maritimum grows on beaches and coastal sand dunes, often with much of the leaves and scapes buried in the sand. Other vernacular names are sea lily, sand daffodil, sand lily and lily of St. Nicholas, (although it is not a true lily). The specific epithet maritimum means "of the sea".

Description
Pancratium maritimum is a bulbous perennial with a long neck and glaucous, broadly linear leaves, evergreen, but the leaves often die back during hot summers. Corona two-thirds as long as the tepals. The flowers have a pleasing, exotic and very subtle lily scent, which only becomes apparent during still, windless summer nights that allow the delicate fragrance to become perceptible. Flowering is from August to October.

Chemistry 
4'-Hydroxy-5,7-dimethoxy-8-methylflavan is a flavan found in P. maritimum.

Ecology

Pancratium maritimum is pollinated by a hawk-moth named Agrius convolvuli. These insects visit the flower only when the speed of the wind is under . Even if the species is pollinated in an artificial way during windy weather the pollination is not effective. Pancratium maritimum is not receptive to its own pollen and must be cross-pollinated.

Cultivation
Easily grown but requires a very sunny position and a very well drained, sandy soil. Needs hot summers to induce flowering and is often a shy bloomer in cooler climates. Hardy to USDA zone 8. Propagation by seeds or division after flowering. Seedlings may flower in their third or fourth year.

Culture
Since the plant grows on the Sharon plain of the coast of the Mediterranean Sea, it is suggested the biblical passage may refer to this flower.

See also

 List of plants known as lily

References

Other sources
 Boulos, L. (1995). Flora of Egypt Checklist: i-xii, 1-287. Al Hadara Publishing, Cairo.
 Boulos, L. (2005). Flora of Egypt 4: 1-617. Al Hadara Publishing, Cairo.
 Britton, N. (1918). Flora of Bermuda: 1-585. Charles Scribner's Sons, New York.
 Czerepanov, S.K. (1995). Vascular Plants of Russia and Adjacent States (The Former USSR): 1-516. Cambridge University Press.
 Danin, A. (2004). Distribution Atlas of Plants in the Flora Palaestina area: 1-517. The Israel Academy of Sciences and Humanities, Jerusalem.
 Davis, P.H. (ed.) (1984). Flora of Turkey and the East Aegean Islands 8: 1-632. Edinburgh University Press, Edinburgh.
 Dobignard, D. & Chatelain, C. (2010). Index synonymique de la flore d'Afrique du nord 1: 1-455. Éditions des conservatoire et jardin botaniques, Genève.
 Hansen, A. & Sunding, P. (1985). Flora of Macaronesia. Checklist of vascular plants. 3. revised edition. Sommerfeltia 1: 5-103.
 Jafri, S.M.H. & El-Gadi, A. (eds.) (1978). Flora of Libya 51: 1-10. Al-Faateh University, Tripoli.
 Maire, R. (1960). Flore de l'Afrique du Nord 6: 1-397. Paul Lechevalier, Paris.
 Meikle, R.D. (1985). Flora of Cyprus 2: 833-1970. The Bentham-Moxon Trust Royal Botanic Gardens, Kew.
 
 
 Tutin, T.G. et al. (eds.) (1980). Flora Europaea 5: 1-452. Cambridge University Press.
 Zervous, S., Raus, T. & Yannitsaros, A. (2009). Additions to the flora of the island of Kalimnos (SE Aegean, Greece). Willdenowia 39: 165-177.

External links

 Visit West Crete,  Safaris In Masai Mara, Pancratium maritimum - Sea daffodil
 Flowers of Chania,  Pancratium maritimum - Sea daffodil 
 Mediterranean Garden Society, Pancratium maritimum

maritimum
Plants described in 1753
Flora of Europe
Flora of North Africa
Flora of the Caucasus
Flora of Turkey
Flora of Israel
Flora of the Canary Islands
Taxa named by Carl Linnaeus
Flora of Palestine (region)